Michael Hill and Jeff Tarango were the defending champions but they competed with different partners that year, Hill with Daniel Vacek and Tarango with David Adams.

Hill and Vacek lost in the first round to Martín García and Luis Lobo.

Adams and Tarango lost in the quarterfinals to Stephen Huss and Myles Wakefield.

Huss and Wakefield won in the final 6–4, 6–2 against García and Lobo.

Seeds

Draw

External links
 2002 Grand Prix Hassan II Doubles Draw

Doubles
- Doubles, 2002 Grand Prix Hassan Ii